These are the official results of the Men's 4x400 metres event at the 2001 IAAF World Championships in Edmonton, Alberta, Canada. Their final was held on Sunday 12 August 2001 at 16:20h.

Records

Final

Heats
Held on Saturday 11 August 2001

Heat 1

Heat 2

Heat 3

References
 Results

 
Relays at the World Athletics Championships